Secondary Highway 500, commonly referred to as Highway 500, was a secondary highway in the Canadian province of Ontario which was first designated in 1956. Its route was renumbered in 1964, becoming:
Highway 649 between Bobcaygeon and the junction with Highway 121 south of Kinmount.
Highway 503 between Kinmount and Tory Hill.
Highway 648 in its entirety from east of Tory Hill to west of Cardiff.
Highway 118 between Highway 503 and the western junction of Highway 648, and between the eastern junction Highway 648 and Highway 28 in Paudash.
Highway 28 between Paudash and Highway 41 in Denbigh, via Bancroft.

500